Koumasa is the site of a prepalatial cemetery on Crete.  The cemetery is located between Loukia and Koumasa near the southern border of the Mesara plain, right at the foothills of the Asterousia-Mountains.  This Minoan archaeological site was first excavated by Stephanos Xanthoudides from 1904 to 1906, which was published in The vaulted tombs of Mesara. After another campaign within the years 1991 and 1992 by Alexandra Karetsou and Athanasia Kanta, the site is investigated by the University of Heidelberg supervised by Prof. Dr. Diamantis Panagiotopoulos.

Archaeological Area

The site contained four tombs; three tholos tombs and one rectangular tomb. Circa 10 meters in diameter and a couple of meters in height, Minoan tholoi are considered to be the tombs of the elite and often richly-stocked with valuable objects. Though the site is known mainly for these sepulcral remains, as being part of Xanthoudides fundamental studies, the site extends further to the east. There, on the steep slope as well as on top of the mound itself, Minoan archaeologists expect the position of the actual city and a precinct of bronze-age Koumasa.

Investigation

After Xanthoudides excavation back at the beginning of the 20th century, Koumasa was robbed and declined until 1991, when Alexandra Karetsou and Athanasia Kanta redirected the attention to the very promising site. The excavations went on until 1992, but were dropped afterwards. With the permission of the Greek ephory (Εφορεία Προϊστορικών και Κλασικών Αρχαιοτήτων) the site is since 2012 under investigation again by a multi-year interdisciplinary research programme of the University of Heidelberg, under the direction von Prof. Dr. Diamantis Panagiotopoulos. The aim is to further investigate the site and its immediate landscape with both archaeological and scientific methods. Within this project experts of the geographical Institute of Heidelberg, supervised by Prof. Dr. Olaf Bubenzer, examine the Koumasa-Area with Terrestrial-Laser-Scanning. In cooperation with the Ben Gurion University of the Negev micromorphological specialists, supervised by Prof. Dr. Yuval Goren, contribute as a third part to the interdisciplinary project.

Archaeological finds
Pottery is of the Early Minoan IIA Koumasa style (hence the name of the site).

 Clay and stone vases
 Seals
 Figurines
 Tools
 3 Silver Daggers

References

Swindale, Ian. "Koumasa" Retrieved 13 January 2006
Xanthoudides, Stéphanos, The Vaulted Tombs of Mesara, 1924.
Herrero, Borja Legarra, The Secret Lives of the Early and Middle Minoan Tholos Cemeteries: Koumasa and Platanos, in: J. Murphy - Ph. Betancourt, Prehistoric Greece. Regional and Diacronic Studies on Mortuary Systems, 2011.

Minoan sites in Crete
Ancient cemeteries in Greece